The Roland S-50 is a 61-key 12-bit sampler keyboard produced by the Roland Corporation in 1986. It featured a 3.5-inch DSDD floppy disk drive and had external CRT monitor support to facilitate editing of samples. It could hold up to 32 samples. A rack-mounted version was also available, which featured expanded memory.

Sample rate
15 to 30 kHz variable sampling rates at a 12-bit resolution, (28.8 seconds and 14.4 seconds respectively) The samples can also be saved to disk (3.5-inch DSDD floppy disk drive).

S-550

A rack-mountable version was released in 1987, which also had twice the sample memory (1.5 Mb) and time-variant filters. A less feature-rich version of the S-550 was also available as the S-330. Both can support the DT-100 Digitizer Tablet and an external computer monitor for visual manipulation of the samples on screen.

References

Further reading

External links
 Roland S-50
 Roland S-50 Sampling Keyboard
 S-50 / S-550 / S-330 / W-30 / S-760 Homepage - Samples, DIY's and Reference Materials - A Website Dedicated To The Original Roland Samplers - http://llamamusic.com/s50s550/s-50_s-550.html

Roland synthesizers
Polyphonic synthesizers
Products introduced in 1986
Samplers (musical instrument)
Japanese brands